Meghan Elizabeth Daum (born February 13, 1970) is an American author, essayist, podcaster, and journalist.

Childhood and education
Although she was born in California, Daum grew up in Austin, Texas, and Ridgewood, New Jersey. She received her bachelor's degree from Vassar College and her Master of Fine Arts degree from Columbia University.

Career
Daum spent much of her twenties in New York City. In 1999, she moved to Lincoln, Nebraska, and the experience became the catalyst for her 2003 novel The Quality of Life Report, which follows the life and times of an ambitious young television journalist who trades New York for the fictional town of Prairie City and explores themes of social class in America as well as the contradictions of the "simplicity movement."  She is also the author of two collections of essays, My Misspent Youth and The Unspeakable: And Other Subjects of Discussion, which was named as a top 10 books of the year by Slate and Entertainment Weekly. It won the 2015 PEN CENTER USA Literary Award for Creative Nonfiction.

Her work has appeared in The New Yorker, The New York Times Magazine, The Atlantic, Vogue, GQ, Harper's and elsewhere.

Daum lives in Los Angeles, California, and New York City. She has been an opinion columnist for the Los Angeles Times since 2005. She is a member of the adjunct faculty in the writing division of the School of the Arts at Columbia University.

Daum is a 2015 Guggenheim Fellow in general nonfiction and the recipient of 2016 National Endowment for the Arts fellowship in creative writing. In 2017 she served as the Bedell Distinguished Visiting Professor at the University of Iowa's Nonfiction Writing Program.

In 2015, Daum wrote an op-ed for the Los Angeles Times about the suicide of transgender teenager Leelah Alcorn. The article was criticized for equating criticism of Alcorn's parents, who subjected her to conversion therapy and socially isolated her for months, with transphobia, as well as denying the Alcorns' actions were motivated by transphobia. The article was also criticized for calling for more compassion for the Alcorns from LGBT people.

In 2020, Daum started a podcast for discussing complicated and controversial issues, The Unspeakable.

Books

References

External links
 

1970 births
Living people
21st-century American novelists
21st-century American women writers
21st-century American essayists
American women journalists
American women novelists
Columbia University School of the Arts alumni
People from Ridgewood, New Jersey
Vassar College alumni
Writers from Omaha, Nebraska
American women podcasters
American podcasters